Kamantan may be,

Kamantan people
Kamantan language